Cui Qiming (born November 1963) is a Chinese diplomat who is the current Communist Party Secretary of China Foreign Affairs University, in office since October 2020.

Biography
Born in November 1963, Cui graduated from Central China Normal University. He joined the Foreign Service in 1992 and has served primarily in the Department of Eastern European and Central Asian Affairs of the Ministry of Foreign Affairs and the Chinese Embassy in the Russian Federation. In January 2014, President Xi Jinping appointed him Chinese Ambassador to Belarus, and he held this post from 2014 until 2020. In October 2020, he was chosen as party secretary of China Foreign Affairs University, succeeding Qi Dayu.

Awards
 22 September 2020 Order of Honor

References

1963 births
Living people
Central China Normal University alumni
Ambassadors of China to Belarus